A botanical garden is a place where plants, especially ferns, conifers and flowering plants, are grown and displayed for the purposes of research and education. This distinguishes them from parks and pleasure gardens where plants, usually with beautiful flowers, are grown for public amenity Botanical gardens that specialize in trees are sometimes referred to as arboreta.  They are occasionally associated with zoos. The Acharya Jagadish Chandra Bose Botanical Garden in West Bengal is the first of its kind in the South Asia.

List of botanical parks

See also
 Arid Forest Research Institute
 Indian Council of Forestry Research and Education
 List of botanical gardens
 Ministry of Environment and Forests (India)

References

 www.chandigarhenvis.gov.in
 www.chandigarh.gov.in

External links

 Botanic Garden Conservation International's garden search database

 
India
Botanical gardens
Botanical gardens